Troy Lynn Fraser (born 10 August 1949) 
is a Republican and a former member of the Texas State Senate. From 1997 through his retirement in 2016, he held the 24th District seat, which encompasses all or parts of the counties of Bandera, Bell, Blanco, Brown, Burnet, Callahan, Comanche, Coryell, Gillespie, Hamilton, Kerr, Lampasas, Llano, Mills, San Saba, Taylor, and Travis.

Biography 
A native of Abilene, Texas, Fraser attended Angelo State University in San Angelo, Texas, and the University of Texas at Arlington. He formerly resided in Belton in Bell County.

A resident of Horseshoe Bay in Llano County west of the capital city of Austin, Fraser also served in the Texas House of Representatives from 1988 to 1993 for District 69, then based about Big Spring in Howard County. He was preceded and succeeded by Democrats Larry D. Shaw of Big Spring and John Hirschi of Wichita Falls, elected in 1992 in a reconfigured district.

In January 2017, he retired from the Senate. In his statement of departure, Fraser said: "For twenty-seven years, I have walked the halls of our magnificent Capitol building. I have marveled at its dome, gazed upon the Goddess of Liberty and dedicated myself to my constituents. To quote the late Bob Bullock, 'only death will end my love affair with Texas.' It's been a great ride."

Fraser said that he is most pleased of his legislation which now requires photo identification for voting in Texas, a measure which he said "ensures the integrity of the ballot box and protects our most sacred privilege." He was Texas Senate President Pro Tempore in 2009. The American Conservative Union gave him a lifetime rating of 94% 

Six candidates sought to succeed Fraser in the Republican primary scheduled for March 1, 2016.

Election history
Senate election history of Fraser from 1992.

Most recent election

2004

Previous elections

2002

2000

1996

1992

References

External links
Senate of Texas - Senator Troy Fraser Official Texas Senate Web site.
Project Vote Smart - Senator Troy L. Fraser (TX) profile
Follow the Money - Troy Fraser
2006 2004 2002 2000 campaign contributions

1949 births
Living people
People from Abilene, Texas
People from Big Spring, Texas
People from Belton, Texas
People from Horseshoe Bay, Texas
Republican Party Texas state senators
Presidents pro tempore of the Texas Senate
Republican Party members of the Texas House of Representatives
Businesspeople from Texas
Angelo State University alumni
University of Texas at Arlington alumni
21st-century American politicians